Jack Rowan may refer to:

 Jack Rowan (baseball) (1886–1966), Major League Baseball pitcher
 Jack Rowan (boxer) (1887–1959), American middleweight boxer
 Jack C. Rowan (1911–1990), head football coach for Northeast Louisiana State
 Jack Rowan (actor) (born 1997), actor